Alexandre "Àlex" Martínez Palau (born 10 October 1998) is an Andorran footballer and beach soccer player who plays for AC Escaldes the Andorra national beach soccer team and the Andorra national football team.

International goals
Scores and results list Andorra's goal tally first.

References

1998 births
Living people
Andorran footballers
Andorran beach soccer players
Association football forwards
UE Santa Coloma players
FC Andorra players
FC Santa Coloma players
Andorra international footballers
Andorra youth international footballers